Abacetus profundillus is a species of ground beetle in the subfamily Pterostichinae. It was described by Straneo in 1943.

References

profundillus
Beetles described in 1943